"Sad Eyed Lady of the Lowlands" is a song by American singer-singwriter Bob Dylan. First released as the final track on Dylan's 1966 album Blonde on Blonde, the song lasts 11 minutes and 23 seconds, and occupies the entire fourth side of the double album. The song was written by Dylan and produced by Bob Johnston. Dylan has revealed that the song was written about his wife, Sara Lownds.

"Sad Eyed Lady of the Lowlands" has polarised music critics and songwriters. Musicologist Wilfrid Mellers wrote that "Sad Eyed Lady of the Lowlands" stands with "Mr. Tambourine Man" as "perhaps the most insidiously haunting pop song of our time". Pink Floyd songwriter Roger Waters said: "'Sad Eyed Lady of the Lowlands" sort of changed my life." By contrast, Dylan critic Michael Gray has described the song as "unsuccessful, and rather grandly so, inasmuch as it is offered as... something of extra-special importance and doesn't live up to its billing." However, Gray later recanted and called the song "a masterpiece if ever there was one".

Background and recording
Bob Dylan began to record the Blonde on Blonde album in New York in October 1965. Frustrated by the slow progress in the studio, Dylan agreed to the suggestion of his producer Bob Johnston and moved to Columbia's A Studio on Music Row, Nashville, Tennessee, in February 1966. Bringing with him Robbie Robertson on guitar and Al Kooper on keyboards, Dylan commenced recording with the cream of Nashville session players.

On February 15, a session began at 6 pm, but Dylan simply sat in the studio working on his lyrics, while the musicians played cards and chatted. Dylan's biographer Clinton Heylin described Dylan writing the song across three recording sessions that had been booked; guitarist Charlie McCoy later recalled that for him and the other musicians to be booked but not play was "unheard of. Everybody was on the clock." Finally, at 4 am, Dylan called the musicians in and outlined the structure of the song. Dylan counted off and the musicians fell in, as he attempted his epic composition, "Sad Eyed Lady of the Lowlands". Drummer Kenny Buttrey recalled, "If you notice that record, that thing after like the second chorus starts building and building like crazy, and everybody's just peaking it up 'cause we thought, Man, this is it... This is gonna be the last chorus and we've gotta put everything into it we can. And he played another harmonica solo and went back down to another verse and the dynamics had to drop back down to a verse kind of feel...After about ten minutes of this thing we're cracking up at each other, at what we were doing. I mean, we peaked five minutes ago. Where do we go from here?" The finished song clocked in at 11 minutes, 23 seconds, and would occupy the entire fourth side of the double album.

Although some participants later recalled that only a single happened, four takes of the song were recorded, three of which were complete. The first take version lasted ten minutes and seven seconds. After an incomplete take two, used to familiarise the musicians with the intended tempo, the third take was just over twelve minutes long. 

The fourth take was released on Blonde on Blonde, Dylan's seventh studio album, on June 20, 1966. The recording session was released in its entirety on the 18-disc Collector's Edition of The Bootleg Series Vol. 12: The Cutting Edge 1965–1966 in 2015, with the first take of the song also appearing on the 6-disc version of that album.

When Dylan played the song to his biographer Robert Shelton, shortly after recording it, he claimed, "This is the best song I've ever written." Around the same time, Dylan enthused to journalist Jules Siegel, "Just listen to that! That's old-time religious carnival music!" However, in 1969, Dylan confessed to Rolling Stone editor, Jann Wenner, "I just sat down at a table and started writing... And I just got carried away with the whole thing... I just started writing and I couldn’t stop. After a period of time, I forgot what it was all about, and I started trying to get back to the beginning [laughs]".

Later account and technique
In 1975, Dylan wrote and recorded a paean to his wife which challenged the account that "Sad Eyed Lady" had been written in the recording studio in Nashville. In "Sara", Dylan located the writing in a bohemian hotel where he and his wife had lived in 1965, singing that he had once been:

The technique employed by Dylan to write the song was to construct the verses as a series of "lists" of the attributes of the eponymous Sad Eyed Lady. These "lists" are complemented by a sequence of rhetorical questions about the Lady which are never answered within the song. Thus, the first verse begins:

Critic Ian Bell wrote: "Those that say 'Sad Eyed Lady of the Lowlands' is a mere jumble of images miss a poet attempting, in the ancient manner, to count the ways of love... and to put the mystery of inviolability and passion into words."

Critical comments

Presumed allusions to Sara Lownds
Critics have noted the similarity of 'Lowlands' to 'Lownds', the name of Dylan's wife Sara. Shelton wrote that "Sad Eyed Lady" was a "wedding song" for Sara Lownds, whom Dylan had married only three months prior to recording the song. Bob Dylan married Sara Lownds on November 22, 1965, at a judge's office on Long Island, New York.  Sara's maiden name was Shirley Noznisky; her father, Isaac Noznisky, was a scrap metal dealer in Wilmington, Delaware. Critics have noted the link between "sheet metal memories of Cannery Row" and the business of Sara's father, as well as the quote "with your sheets like metal and your belts like lace". Similarly the line "your magazine husband who one day just had to go" could be a reference to Sara's first husband, a magazine photographer named Hans Lownds.

Literary allusions 

Writing about "Sad Eyed Lady", historian Sean Wilentz comments that Dylan's writing had shifted from the days when he asked questions and supplied answers. Like the verses of William Blake's "Tyger", Dylan asks a series of questions about the "Sad Eyed Lady" but never supplies any answers.

Literary critic Christopher Ricks compares both the imagery and the meter of "Sad Eyed Lady" to a poem by Algernon Swinburne, "Dolores", published in 1866. Ricks describes Swinburne's poem as an "anti-prayer to his anti-madonna, an interrogation that hears no need why it should ever end". Ricks writes that "Dolores moves...'To a tune that enthralls and entices', as does 'Sad Eyed Lady of the Lowlands." Ricks makes the point that "Dolores" "insists upon listing… all of her energies, her incitements and excitements, her accoutrements, her weapons" as does "Sad Eyed Lady".  Ricks describes the way in which Dylan's song attributes so many objects and qualities to the Sad Eyed Lady as "part inventory, part arsenal, these returns of phrases are bound by awe of her and by suspicion of her".

Referring to the phrase repeated in the chorus of the song, "Sad eyed lady of the lowlands/ Where the sad eyed prophet says that no man comes", Ricks suggests that the prophet Ezekiel is relevant, noting that the phrase "no man" occurs several times in the Book of Ezekiel. Ricks also notes several references to "gates" in that Book, as in Dylan's song. "This gate shall be shut, it shall not be opened, and no man may enter in by it." Ezekiel 44:2. Dylan's song alludes to "the kings of Tyrus", and Ricks points out that, in the Book of Ezekiel, Tyrus is described as "a merchant of the people for many isles" (Ezekiel 27:3); this chapter of Ezekiel lists the many commodities and luxuries which Tyrus trades in, including silver, gold, spices, precious stones, emeralds, ebony and ivory.  Thus, for Ricks, Tyrus is "one huge warehouse of hubris", but there is a force that can outwait the kings of Tyrus, "the Lord, he who speaks through his propher Ezekiel of the doom to come".

Favourable responses

Ralph Gleason wrote in 1966 that "Sad Eyed Lady of the Lowlands" was "a ghostly enigma. Allen Ginsberg says it stands as a good poem all by itself, which is praise of the first rank". The Boston Globe reviewer Ernie Santosuosso commented of the song that "It's Dylan at his most esoteric best in this wailing tribute filled with sense-boggling word figures." In Melody Maker, the song was described as "an appealing hymnic chant which ranks with the best of the new Dylan" Richard Goldstein of The Village Voice found that "all that is necessary to appreciate the willowy beauty of its lyrics is to think closely of a personal sad-eyed lady and let the images do the rest".

Because the song was recorded at around four in the morning, critic Andy Gill feels the work has a nocturnal quality similar to "Visions of Johanna". Organist Kooper told an interviewer from Mojo that "to me, [Sad Eyed Lady of the Lowlands] is the definitive version of what 4 am sounds like". Gill comments on the "measured grace and stately pace" of the song's rhythm, characterising the mood of the song as "as much funeral procession as wedding march". Gill notes that, though the song has its share of enigmatic imagery, there is no trace of the jokey nihilism that marks out much of the rest of Blonde on Blonde. "This time around", writes Gill, "it's serious". Timothy Hampton commented that Dylan's "technique of varying the chorus as a way of isolating the singer from the listener" that he employed on some of the Blonde on Blonde tracks is in evidence on "Sad Eyed Lady of the Lowlands". Hampton remarks that as Dylan sings ahead of the beat, and considers that "you cannot quite ever sing along".

Heard by some listeners as a hymn to an other-worldly woman, for Shelton "her travails seem beyond endurance, yet she radiates an inner strength, an ability to be re-born. This is Dylan at his most romantic".

Musicologist Wilfrid Mellers writes that "Sad Eyed Lady" stands with "Mr. Tambourine Man" as "perhaps the most insidiously haunting pop song of our time". Mellers claims that Dylan has succeeded in concentrating contradictory qualities into the Lady: "It's impossible to tell... whether the Lady is a creature of dream or nightmare; but she's beyond good and evil as the cant phrase has it, only in the sense that the simple, hypnotic, even corny waltz tune contains... both fulfilment and regret. Mysteriously, the song even erases Time. Though chronologically it lasts nearly 20 minutes (sic), it enters a mythological once-upon-a-time where the clock doesn't tick".

Jim Beviglia ranked the song as Dylan's best in his 2013 book Counting Down Bob Dylan: His 100 Finest Songs, referring to it as "the greatest love song there is, was, and ever will be" and considering it Dylan's "finest combination of lyrics, melody and performance". In 2015, the song was ranked 27th on Rolling Stones "100 Greatest Bob Dylan Songs". In a 2020 article for The Guardian, Alexis Petridis ranked it the ninth-greatest of Dylan's songs, and felt that "its understated sound, cyclical melody and devotional lyrics" provided persuasive evidence that the track was a "masterpiece".

More ambivalent responses
New Yorker music critic Alex Ross analysed "Sad Eyed Lady" to explore the paradoxical way in which Dylan can be both verbose and musically magisterial. Ross notes that the lyrics of the song become increasingly hard to fathom, writing that in the second-to-last verse, Dylan's meaning clouds over: "'They wished you’d accepted the blame for the farm.' What farm? What happened to it? Why would she be to blame for it?"

Ross further interrogates Dylan’s imagery: "What are 'warehouse eyes', and how can one leave them by a gate? Dylanologists beat their heads against such questions. But the music makes you forget them. The melody of the refrain—a rising and descending scale, as in 'Danny Boy'—is grand to begin with, but in the fifth verse Dylan makes it grander. As the band keeps playing the scale, he skates back up to the top D with each syllable." Ross suggests that Dylan's technique is here reminiscent of the soprano in Purcell's Dido and Aeneas who "catches our hearts in the same way as she sings, 'Remember me, remember me'."

Clinton Heylin has described "Sad Eyed Lady" as both "possibly the most pretentious set of lyrics ever penned", but also "a captivating carousel of a performance". Heylin suggests that Dylan was driven to try to create a song that would reach a new level of writing and performance. Heylin quotes from Dylan's San Francisco press conference on December 3, 1965, when he stated he was interested in "writing [a] symphony... with different melodies and different words, different ideas... which just roll on top of each other... the end result being a total[ity]... They say my songs are long now. Some time [I'm] just gonna come up with one that's gonna be the whole album". This ambitious plan ultimately gave birth to "Sad Eyed Lady", a song Heylin describes as "a thirteen minute one-trick pony".

Dylan scholar Michael Gray expressed a similarly contradictory attitude to "Sad Eyed Lady". In his book Song & Dance Man III, Gray writes of the song's imagery: "Dylan is... cooing nonsense in our ears, very beguilingly of course. The only thing that unites the fragments is the mechanical device of the return to the chorus and thus to the title... It is, in the end, not a whole song at all but unconnected chippings, and only the poor cement of an empty chorus and a regularity of tune gives the illusion that things are otherwise". The fact that it occupies the entire fourth side of Blonde on Blonde leads Gray to conclude that the song is "unsuccessful, and rather grandly so, inasmuch as it is offered on the album as something of extra-special importance and doesn't live up to its billing."

In a footnote to this passage, written for the 2000 edition of his book, Gray modified his view: "When I read this assessment now, I simply feel embarrassed at what a little snob I was when I wrote it ... Whatever the shortcomings of the lyric, the recording itself, capturing at its absolute peak Dylan's incomparable capacity for intensity of communication, is a masterpiece if ever there was one".

Perhaps the most hostile critique of "Sad Eyed Lady" was written by Lester Bangs in a review of Dylan's 1975 album Desire. Noting that Dylan's claims in his song "Sara" to have written "Sad Eyed Lady of the Lowlands" in the Chelsea Hotel, Bangs writes: "I have it on good authority that Dylan wrote "Sad Eyed Lady", as well as about half of the rest of Blonde on Blonde, wired out of his skull in the studio, just before the songs were recorded, while the session men sat around waiting on him …Those lyrics were a speed trip, and if he really did spend days on end sitting in the Chelsea Hotel sweating over lines like "your streetcar visions which you place on the grass", then he is stupider than we ever gave him credit for."

Personnel
Credits adapted from That Thin, Wild Mercury Sound: Dylan, Nashville, and the Making of Blonde on Blonde.
Bob Dylanvocals, acoustic guitar, harmonica
Hargus "Pig" Robbinspiano
Al Kooperorgan
Charlie McCoyacoustic guitar
Wayne Mossacoustic guitar
Joe Southelectric bass
Kenny ButtreydrumsTechnical'''
Bob Johnstonrecord producer

Live performances, cover versions, and legacy
Dylan has never performed this song in concert. However, during the "Woman In White" sequence of Dylan's film Renaldo And Clara, a live performance of the song can be heard in the background. Heylin writes that Dylan, accompanied by Scarlet Rivera on violin, Rob Stoner on bass, and Howie Wyeth on drums, recorded this version at a rehearsal during The Rolling Thunder Revue in 1975.

Joan Baez covered the song for her 1968 album Any Day Now. Harper Barnes of the St. Louis Post-Dispatch, mentioning that it was "rumored that the song was written for – and about" Baez, felt that "Without apparent narcississm, she beautifully sustains 'Sad Eyed Lady of the Lowlands' for more than 11 minutes." Richie Havens included a seven-minute version on his 1974 album Mixed Bag II. Joe Sornberger of the Edmonton Journal described Havens's version as an "upbeat, almost funky love tribute" that retained the "original poetic power of the song" and retained its "essence" despite being much shorter than Dylan's original.

Alternative French band Phoenix recorded a live five-minute acoustic cover for the German magazine Musikexpress, that Rolling Stone reviewer Daniel Kreps felt was true to the original despite the reduced duration. Andrew Stafford of The Guardian felt Emma Swift's 12-minute cover on her 2020 album Blonde on the Tracks "never flags, [and is] sung with patience and grace".

In his autobiography, I, Me, Mine, published in 1980, George Harrison says that the chord changes of "Sad Eyed Lady" influenced the music of Harrison's Beatles song Long, Long, Long, which he wrote and recorded in October 1968 for the album The Beatles, sometimes known as  "The White Album". Harrison wrote: "I can't recall much about it except the chords, which I think were coming from 'Sad Eyed Lady of the Lowlands' – D to E minor, A, and D – those three chords and the way they moved".

Tom Waits said of "Sad Eyed Lady of the Lowlands" in 1991: "It is like Beowulf'' and it 'takes me out to the meadow'. This song can make you leave home, work on the railroad or marry a Gypsy. I think of a drifter around a fire with a tin cup under a bridge remembering a woman's hair. The song is a dream, a riddle and a prayer".

In a radio interview with Howard Stern in January 2012, former Pink Floyd bassist and songwriter Roger Waters revealed: "'Sad Eyed Lady of the Lowlands' changed my life... When I heard that, I thought, 'If Bob can do it, I can do it'... it's a whole album side! And it in no way gets dull or boring. It becomes more and more hypnotic".

Notes

Footnotes

References

 
 
 
 
 
 

 
 

 
 

 
 

 

Songs written by Bob Dylan
Bob Dylan songs
Jon Anderson songs
Joan Baez songs
1966 songs
Song recordings produced by Bob Johnston